"Eater" is the fifth episode of the NBC horror anthology Fear Itself and is based on the Peter Crowther short story of the same name.

Plot

Elisabeth Moss plays Officer Danny Bannerman, a "boot", or newly recruited police officer. Bannerman is part of a detail guarding Mellor, a Cajun  serial killer and cannibal nicknamed "Eater” (because one of his crimes involved him torturing, butchering, and eating a young woman while she was still alive). As the night wears on, she begins to recognize that her all-male colleague's behavior is getting stranger by the minute and that they are being killed one-by-one. Bannerman later finds out that the “Eater” has been using black magic all along and that he was hoping to use it on her to make her free him and then kill her afterwards.

He gets his wish by having stolen Bannerman’s keys in an earlier confrontation between the two and he begins to hunt for Bannerman. Meanwhile, Bannerman is on the run and tries to look for an exit but they are all locked or blocked off. Instead she devises a plan, and, while hiding from the Mellor in a broom closet, she ingests rat poison and calls out to the “Eater”. As Bannerman and Mellor have an epic fight, she gets a pair of handcuffs on both of them. Mellor becomes enraged and begins to chow down on her. She manages to kill the “Eater” because she had ingested rat poison earlier and because of this, Mellor also gets poisoned and cries out in a fit of rage; “You killed me, bitch! You killed me!” and both Bannerman and Mellor die.

Reception 
Critical reception for the episode was generally positive. The A.V. Club rated the episode an A−, crediting "Eater" as "easily the strongest episode to date and the only one that actually scared me at moments." Bloody Disgusting and Den of Geek both credited Stuart Gordon's directing as a boon to the episode, which they felt was lacking at times.

IGN's Matt Fowler was more critical, criticizing the series for having too many episodes that failed to maintain suspension of disbelief and also stating that "all of the juvenile behavior from the cops during the story was completely inane and did nothing except prevent me from becoming the least bit interested in this episode".

References

External links
 

2008 American television episodes
Television episodes about cannibalism